Wisemans Ferry is a town in the Greater Sydney area and the Central Coast region in the state of New South Wales, Australia, located 75 kilometres north north-west of the Sydney central business district in the Sydney local government areas of Hornsby Shire, The Hills Shire, City of Hawkesbury and the regional local government area of  .
The town is a tourist spot with picnic and barbecue facilities. As well as a rich convict and colonial heritage in the area, the Dharug National Park and Yengo National Park are close by.

History
The town was originally called Lower Portland Headland, but the name was eventually changed to Wisemans Ferry, named after Solomon Wiseman, a former convict (1777–1838), who received a land grant in the area from Governor Macquarie in 1817. Wiseman established a ferry service on the Hawkesbury River in 1827 for the transport of produce and provisions to the convicts building the Great North Road and was known to many as King of the Hawkesbury.

Wisemans Ferry Post Office opened on 1 January 1857.

There is information on the early history of Wisemans Ferry in Ball, John and Pam, 'Early Wisemans Ferry: George Mollison, Solomon Wiseman, Bushrangers and Land Title Confusion', Oughtershaw Press, Riverview, 2014 - .

Heritage listings 
Wisemans Ferry & Mount Manning has a number of heritage-listed sites, including:
 Old Great North Road (Devine's Hill to Mount Manning Section)

Schools

Wisemans Ferry Public School was established in 1867.

Transport
Today, two ferry services cross the Hawkesbury River from the town of Wisemans Ferry. The eponymous Wisemans Ferry crosses the river to a point down-stream of its confluence with the Macdonald River, connecting with the old Great North Road. Webbs Creek Ferry crosses to a point upstream of the confluence, connecting with the St Albans Road that follows the west bank of the Macdonald River.

References

External links

 
Great North Road - Convict Trail
Wisemans Ferry bus timetable

Suburbs of Sydney
City of Hawkesbury
Towns in New South Wales
1827 establishments in Australia
The Hills Shire
Hornsby Shire